Birgitta Moran Farmer (1881–1939) was an American artist particularly known for her portrait miniatures.

Life
Farmer was born in Lyons, New York. She attended Lyons Public School and graduated from the Convent of the Sacred Heart in Rochester NY.  A graduate of the College of Fine Arts of Syracuse University and a member of Gamma Phi Beta's Alpha Chapter, she won the 1906 Hiram Gee Award in Painting at commencement. She used the award to study at Académie Julian and Académie de la Grande Chaumière Paris during 1906–1907.  Among other places, she roomed at the American Girl's Club in Paris.

She married Dr. Thomas Patrick Farmer of Syracuse, New York. They had four children. She exhibited with the Brooklyn Society of Miniature Painters, American Society of Miniature Painters, the Pennsylvania Society of Miniature Painters, the National Association of Women Painters and Sculptors, and the Associated Artists of Syracuse. She died in 1939 in Syracuse, New York, of cancer.

Art
Farmer's work including her 1924 self-portrait was exhibited at the 24th and 25th Annual Exhibition of American Society of Miniature Painters  and the Pennsylvania Society of Miniature Painters's 38th Annual Exhibition.

Her portrait of her daughter "Anne" was included in the 1933 Chicago World's Fair Century of Progress "Exhibition of Miniature Paintings by Living Artists", The Metropolitan Museum of Art "Four Centuries of Miniature Painting", and the Smithsonian American Art Museum National Collection of Fine Arts.
Farmer is included in the National Portrait Gallery (United States) Catalog of American Portraits, the National Portrait Gallery Library  and the Archives of American Art.  Her art was often signed “B K Moran”, “Moran”, or “B M Farmer”.

References

1881 births
1939 deaths
20th-century American painters
Portrait miniaturists
American women painters
Académie Julian alumni
Alumni of the Académie de la Grande Chaumière
People from Lyons, New York
20th-century American women artists